The 1997 Tour of the Basque Country was the 37th edition of the Tour of the Basque Country cycle race and was held from 7 April to 11 April 1997. The race started in Legazpi and finished at Gatzaga. The race was won by Alex Zülle of the ONCE team.

General classification

References

1997
Bas